"There You Go" is a 2000 song by Pink.

There You Go may also refer to:

 "There You Go" (Exile song), 1990
 "There You Go" (Johnny Cash song), 1956
 "There You Go" (Prescott-Brown song), 1994
 "There You Go", a song by Caedmon's Call from 40 Acres, 1999
 "There You Go", a song by Change of Heart, 1992
 "There U Go", a song by Johnny Gill from the Boomerang film soundtrack, 1992
 "(There You Go) Tellin' Me No Again", a song by Keith Sweat from Keep It Comin', 1991